František Kašický (born 18 November 1968 in Gelnica, Czechoslovakia) was a defence minister of Slovakia from 4 July 2006 to 30 January 2008.

Kašický is a former chief of Office of the Minister of Defence, Director of Communication Department, and ministry spokesman. Between 2003 and 2004, Kašický was a director of Military Defence Intelligence at the Ministry of Defence.

After it was found that the Slovak ministry of defence had accepted overpriced contracts for various services, such as cleaning, Kašický resigned on 30 January 2008.

Kašický was the Slovak ambassador to Norway and Iceland from 2013 to 2017.

References

External links
 Official website of the Ministry of Defence of the Slovak Republic 

1968 births
Living people
People from Gelnica
Defence Ministers of Slovakia
Ambassador of Slovakia to Norway
Ambassador of Slovakia to Iceland